Lee Duck-hee (이덕희; born 29 May 1998) is a South Korean professional tennis player. He has won 10 titles on the ITF Junior Circuit as a teenager, including Grade 2 tournaments in Nanjing and Sarawak.

Personal life 
Lee was born deaf. On the tennis court, he can hear vibrations, but must rely on hand gestures to pick up line calls and the umpire. In 2015, his story was included during a campaign for the ANZ Bank, which was a sponsor for the Australian Open that year.

Professional career
He turned pro in 2013. He played his first Challenger match at age 14. In August 2019 he became the first deaf player to compete in and win a match in the main draw of an ATP tournament with a win over Henri Laaksonen at the Winston-Salem Open.

Challenger and Futures/World Tennis Tour finals

Singles: 18 (13–5)

Doubles: 3 (0–3)

References

External links
 
 

1998 births
Living people
South Korean male tennis players
People from Jecheon
Tennis players at the 2014 Summer Youth Olympics
Deaf tennis players
South Korean deaf people
Tennis players at the 2018 Asian Games
Medalists at the 2018 Asian Games
Asian Games medalists in tennis
Asian Games bronze medalists for South Korea
Sportspeople from North Chungcheong Province
21st-century South Korean people